Puerto Plata (Silver Port) is one of the northern provinces of the Dominican Republic. The area has become an increasingly popular tourist attraction since the late 1990s mainly due to its fine beaches. It borders the Septentrional mountain range to the north (which separates it from Laguna Salada).

Created from the Santiago Province in 1867 as a "maritime district", it became a province in 1907, when maritime districts were suppressed by a new Dominican constitution.

Municipalities and municipal districts

The province is divided into the following municipalities (municipios) and municipal districts (distrito municipal - D.M.) within them:
San Felipe de Puerto Plata
Maimón (D.M.)
Yásica Arriba (D.M.)
Altamira
Río Grande (D.M.)
Guananico
Imbert
Los Hidalgos
Cerro de Navas (D.M.)
Luperón
Los Bellosos (D.M.)
La Isabela (D.M.)
Sosúa
Cabarete (D.M.)
Sabaneta de Yásica (D.M.)
Villa Isabela
Estero Hondo (D.M.)
La Jaiba (D.M.)
Gualete (D.M.)
Villa Montellano

The following is a sortable table of the municipalities with population figures as of the 2012 census (the last national census). Urban population are those living in the seats (cabeceras literally heads) of municipalities or of municipal districts. Rural population are those living in the districts (Secciones literally sections) and neighborhoods (Parajes literally places) outside of them.

For comparison with the municipalities and municipal districts of other provinces see the list of municipalities and municipal districts of the Dominican Republic.

Notable People
Huascar Ynoa (b. 1998), pitcher for the Atlanta Braves

See also
Gregorio Luperón International Airport

References

External links
  Oficina Nacional de Estadística, Statistics Portal of the Dominican Republic
  Oficina Nacional de Estadística, Maps with administrative division of the provinces of the Dominican Republic, downloadable in PDF format

 
Provinces of the Dominican Republic
States and territories established in 1844
Resorts in the Dominican Republic